Antainambalana (Also known as Antainambalan on some maps) is a river in the region of Analanjirofo in north-eastern Madagascar. It flows down from the highlands to flow into the Bay of Antongil and the Indian Ocean near Maroantsetra.

History
In the 18th century this river was called Tingballe River by early European navigators.

References

Rivers of Analanjirofo
Rivers of Madagascar